Vito Belarmino was a general during the Philippine Revolution. He was placed by Emilio Aguinaldo in command in the province of Albay. There, he established a republican government. He was a Major general.

Battles 
He joined Aguinaldo in the assault against Infantry Battalion No. 72 of the Spanish Army stationed in Talisay, Batangas. In this encounter,  Aguinaldo left to him the leadership of the successful attack on the convent and church and on the Spanish guards.

References 

1857 births
1933 deaths
People from Cavite